Dennis Robert Peron (April 8, 1945 – January 27, 2018) was an American activist and businessman who became a leader in the movement for the legalization of cannabis throughout the 1990s. He influenced many in California and thus changed the political debate on marijuana in the United States.

Biography
Peron was born in The Bronx, New York City, into an Italian-American family and grew up in Long Island. He served in the United States Air Force in Vietnam during the Tet Offensive. After the war, he moved to the Castro District, San Francisco, where he became an active Yippie and organized smoke-ins. He also supported gay activist Harvey Milk, a former Long Island resident, who won an elected seat on the San Francisco Board of Supervisors in 1977.

Peron sold cannabis from storefronts in the Castro and advocated for medical cannabis, as he saw how patients with AIDS benefited from it. His partner, Jonathan West, whom he met in San Francisco, died of AIDS in 1990. In 1991, Peron organized for the passage of San Francisco's Proposition P, a resolution calling on the state government to permit medical cannabis, which received 79% of the vote. That same year, he co-founded the San Francisco Cannabis Buyers Club, the first public cannabis dispensary. His businesses were raided by authorities in 1978 and 1990. In 1993, Peron and Brownie Mary jointly released a cookbook with recipes for cannabis edibles.

In 1996, Peron coauthored California Proposition 215, which sought to allow the use of medical cannabis. Dan Lungren, the Attorney General of California, ordered a police raid of Peron's club a month before the election, arresting Peron. Peron worked with other activists such as Scott Imler and Valerie Corral. Proposition 215 was passed soon thereafter, which allowed the club to reopen. Later in 1996, the Grassroots-Legalize Cannabis Party of Minnesota fielded Peron as their nominee, their first, in the U.S. presidential election. Peron received 5,400 votes. In 1998, Peron ran in the Republican primary for California governor against Lungren, who won the primary and lost the election to Gray Davis.

Peron voiced support for decriminalization of all marijuana use, believing that it is medicinal. He opposed medical marijuana use for children. Peron opposed California Proposition 19 in 2010, which would have legalized recreational cannabis, because he did not believe that recreational use exists, as all people who use marijuana are using it medicinally. He opposed California Proposition 64 in 2016.

Later in life, Peron owned and operated a  cannabis farm near Clearlake, California. San Francisco's Board of Supervisors recognized Peron, who was suffering with late-stage lung cancer, with a certificate of honor in 2017. Supervisor Jeff Sheehy called Peron "the father of medical cannabis". On January 27, 2018, aged 72, Peron died of lung cancer at the Veteran's Administration Health Center in San Francisco.

References

External links

"Pothole Awaits Calif. Attorney General in Drive for Governor", The Washington Post
Biography, MisterSF.com; accessed January 28, 2018. 
Dennis Peron: The Marijuana Mouse That Roared, High Times

1945 births
2018 deaths
People from the Bronx
People from Long Island
Military personnel from New York (state)
20th-century American politicians
Activists from the San Francisco Bay Area
American cannabis activists
Cannabis political party politicians
Cannabis in California
Deaths from lung cancer in California
American gay writers
Grassroots Party politicians
HIV/AIDS activists
American LGBT rights activists
Candidates in the 1996 United States presidential election
Yippies
American people of Italian descent